The Americas Zone is one of the three zones of regional Davis Cup competition in 2015.

In the Americas Zone there are three different groups in which teams compete against each other to advance to the next group.

Participating nations

Seeds:

Remaining Nations:

Draw 

 relegated to Group II in 2016.
 and  advance to World Group Play-off.

First round

Barbados vs. Dominican Republic

Second round

Uruguay vs. Colombia

Dominican Republic vs. Ecuador

First round playoffs

Barbados vs. Ecuador

Second round playoffs

Barbados vs. Uruguay

References

External links
Official Website

Americas Zone Group I
Davis Cup Americas Zone

it:Coppa Davis 2015 Zona Asia/Oceania Gruppo I
zh:2015年台維斯盃亞洲及大洋洲區第一級